Bickell is a surname. Notable people with the surname include:

Bryan Bickell (born 1986), Canadian professional ice hockey player currently under contract for the Carolina Hurricanes of the National Hockey League (NHL)
Frederick Bickell Guthrie (1861–1927), Australian agricultural chemist and a president of the Royal Society of New South Wales
Gustav Bickell (1838–1906), German orientalist
Jack Bickell (1884–1951), Canadian businessman, philanthropist, and sports team owner

See also
J. P. Bickell Memorial Award, named after the late Toronto businessman and hockey executive J. P. Bickell